The Innocent Ones is the seventh studio album from American musician Willie Nile. It was released in 2010 under Nile's River House Records and introduced One Guitar, winner of the 2013 AIM Independent Music Awards for Best Social Action Song

Critical reviews 
L. Kent Wolgamontt of the Lincoln Journal Star named "The Innocent Ones" one of the best rock n roll records of 2011.

Track listing

Personnel
Musicians
 Willie Nile – guitar, vocals, piano, organ, keyboards, harmonica
 Steuart Smith – guitars, bass, pump organ, banjo, piano on "Sideways Beautiful"
 Frankie Lee – drums, percussion, background vocals

Production and additional personnel
 Produced  – Stewart Lerman, Willie Nile, Frankie Lee, and Hirsch Gardner
 Engineered – Stewart Lerman, Hirsch Gardner, Willie NIle, Frankie Lee
 Marketing – Bob Chiappardi
 Mixing – Hirsch Gardner
 Mastering – Fred Kevorkian
 Art direction – Deborah Maniaci
 Photography – Thomas Weller (Front & Back Cover), Christina Arrigoni

References

External links

2010 albums
Willie Nile albums
Albums produced by Stewart Lerman